

History 
The evolution of Croatian libraries occurred in three distinct phases:

First phase: 1830s 
Reading rooms, the precursor to public libraries, first appeared in Croatia in the late 1830s. Similar to other Western countries, reading rooms were places where men with common views could meet and discuss issues in solidarity. Driven by their opposition to Austro-Hungarian rule, libraries in Croatia were created with the intention of nurturing the "Croatian language and culture, as well as national awakening and identity." The founders stipulated that reading material must be written in Croatian. These rooms were often referred to as Illyrian reading rooms, named after the political and cultural Illyrian movement. The first Illyrian reading room opened in Varaždin in January 1838. Others soon opened, and by the end of the nineteenth century, more than 180 reading rooms were operating in Croatia.

Second phase: 1870s–1900 
Reading rooms started functioning as libraries rather than just a place to discuss political activities. 
–

Third phase: 1900–current 
Libraries that are publicly funded began to appear in Croatia during the 20th century. However, World War I slowed down the progress of libraries. The lack of progress can be attributed to Croatia joining the Kingdom of Yugoslavia, where individual and national rights were restricted.

1945–1960 
After WWII, Croatia became one of the six republics of the Socialist Federal Republic of Yugoslavia. Citing post war enthusiasm, author Dijana Sabolović-Krajina writes that libraries open in great numbers.

1960–1990 
The Librarianship Act of 1960 is passed. Librarianship and libraries in Croatia strengthen thanks to a "set legal and professional framework for all types of libraries."

1991–1995 
During the Croatian War of Independence, libraries, many libraries experienced disruption to patron services due to the conflict. More than 200 libraries, as well as museums and archives sustained some sort of damage or were destroyed, including valuable and irreplaceable historical collections. Rebuilding libraries postwar became a “top priority at the close of the twentieth century.” Unlike other Eastern Bloc countries, Croatians were free to travel to the West. As a result of this contact, Western libraries "influenced the character and progress of Croatian libraries and librarianship before and after the 1990s."

Post-socialist period 
After the war ended and the country gained independence, Croatia transformed from a socialist republic to a political and economic democracy. In 1997, the government passed the Library Act, a law decrees that a public library should be established in communities with more than 5000 residents. However, not all communities are able to comply with this law due to limited finances or resources.

According to statistics, it is estimated that there were a total of 1,731 as of 2010. This includes libraries that fall into public, national, university or higher education, church, general education, and special library categories. Academic, special, and research libraries are governed by the Ministry of Science, Education, and Sports, while the Ministry of Culture is responsible for public libraries. Both are governed by the Croatian Library Council.

Libraries in the 21st century 
In 2016, Croatian public librarians collaborated with EIFL to help develop a vision on what libraries could do to improve the country. They arrived at four goals: provide advanced digital skills that help young people become employable in technical fields, help foster interest in creative industries, improve access to those living in rural areas, and promote social inclusion.

COVID-19 pandemic 
As with other libraries world-wide, the country's libraries closed or scaled back services during the COVID-19 pandemic. The Croatian Library Council urged libraries to work and, as far as possible, remain "accessible to users as important support to the community"

Public libraries 

 August Cesarac Library, Šubićeva
Biograd City Library
Fran Galović Koprivnica Public Library
Hrvatsko knjižničarsko društvo
Hvar Public Library
Ivan Goran Kovačić City Library
Ivan Vidali Library
Juraj Šižgorić Šibenik City Library
Krapina City Library
 Marko Marulić City Library
Matija Vlačić Ilirik Public Library
Medvescak Library
 Orebic Library
 Peter Preradović Bjelovar National Library
Poreč City Library
 Pula-Pola City Library
Research Library of Zadar
 Slobostina Library
Town Library and Reading Room
 Tsrat National Reading Room
 Villa Ružić
Zadar City Library

College and university libraries 

 City and University Library in Osijek
Library of Croatian Academy of Arts and Sciences
Library of the Faculty of Humanities and Social Sciences
National and University Library in Zagreb
University Library Rijeka
 University of Split Library

References

External links 
 August Cesarac Library, Šubićeva
 Biograd City Library
 City and University Library in Osijek
 Fran Galović Koprivnica Public Library
 Hrvatsko knjižničarsko društvo
 Library of Croatian Academy of Arts and Sciences

Libraries in Croatia